Princess Frederica of Prussia (30 September 1796 – 1 January 1850) was a daughter of Prince Louis Charles of Prussia and Frederica of Mecklenburg-Strelitz. She was a member of the House of Hohenzollern. By her marriage to Leopold IV, Duke of Anhalt-Dessau, she would become Duchess consort of Anhalt-Dessau.

Family
Frederica was the youngest child and only daughter of Prince Louis Charles of Prussia and his wife Frederica of Mecklenburg-Strelitz. Her father was a younger son of Frederick William II of Prussia. Due to her mother's later marriages, Frederica would have many half-siblings, including George V of Hanover.

Marriage and children
On 18 April 1818, Frederica married Leopold IV, Duke of Anhalt in Berlin. They had been engaged since 17 May 1816, as the connection had already been arranged by the Prussian court. This dynastic connection was an expression of Leopold's pro-Prussian policies.

They had six children:

Frederica died on 1 January 1850 in Dessau. Leopold would die 21 years later, on 22 May 1871.

Honours 
 Dame of the Order of Louise. (Kingdom of Prussia)

Ancestry

References

Sources

1796 births
1850 deaths
Prussian princesses
House of Hohenzollern
People from Berlin
House of Ascania
German duchesses
Duchesses of Anhalt
Royal reburials